Robert Hugh Steele (born August 2, 1956) is a former American football wide receiver in the National Football League for the Dallas Cowboys and Minnesota Vikings. He played college football at the University of North Alabama.

Early years
Steele attended Hardaway High School in Columbus, Georgia, where he became a starter at tight end until his senior season. He accepted a scholarship from Division II University of North Alabama, where he became a two-year starter at wide receiver.

As a junior, he led the team with 30 receptions for 566 yards, a Gulf South Conference-leading 19.3 yards a reception and 5 touchdowns. The next year, the team implemented a run-oriented veer offense, but he still led with 24 receptions for 386 yards and one touchdown.

Professional career

Dallas Cowboys
Steele was signed as an undrafted free agent by the Dallas Cowboys after the 1978 NFL draft. Although he was released prior to the final pre-season game, he was later re-signed on September 6 after the team traded wide receiver Golden Richards. 

As a rookie, he was used only on special teams and didn't register a reception as the team's fourth wide receiver. He played in Super Bowl XIII. He was waived on August 27, 1979.

Minnesota Vikings
On August 29, 1979, the Minnesota Vikings claimed him off waivers. On November 25, he blocked a punt against the Tampa Bay Buccaneers. He was released on August 27, 1980.

Publications
 Steele Here: An Underdog's Secret to Success

Personal life
Steele served on the Georgia State Legislature as an elected State Representative. His father owned the Columbus Astros, a minor league affiliate of the Houston Astros baseball team.

References

External links
Alumnus reflects on time with Dallas Cowboys
Football underdog turns into leader of the business pack

1956 births
Living people
Players of American football from Columbus, Georgia
American football wide receivers
North Alabama Lions football players
Dallas Cowboys players
Minnesota Vikings players